The 2016 Gagarin Cup playoffs of the Kontinental Hockey League (KHL) began on February 21, 2016, with the top eight teams from each of the conferences, following the conclusion of the 2015–16 KHL regular season.

Playoff seeds
After the regular season, the standard 16 teams qualified for the playoffs. The Western Conference regular season winners and Continental Cup winners are CSKA Moscow with 127 points. Avangard Omsk are the Eastern Conference regular season winners with 106 points.

Draw
The playoffs started on February 21, 2016, with the top eight teams from each of the conferences and ended with the last game of the Gagarin Cup final on April 19, 2016.

Sibir vs Metallurg Game 4 controversy

In response to an appeal filed by Sibir demanding the cancellation of the game result, according to Sibir GM Kirill Fastovsky, the KHL noted "there was no refereeing error".

According to the KHL, this demand of Sibir about the cancellation of the game result "could not be considered as an appeal" because "the appeal procedure was not strictly followed" by Sibir (mandatory note in the official game sheet by the club representative after the end of the game about their intention to appeal against the game result, followed by filing the appeal within 24 hours along with required supporting evidence). The message from the KHL also referenced Clause 77 of the KHL Sports Regulations and noted the impossibility to accept for consideration appeals based on complaints to refereeing.

Player statistics

Scoring leaders

  
As of 19 Apr 2016

Source: KHL

Leading goaltenders

As of 19 Apr 2016

Source: KHL

References

2015–16 KHL season
Gagarin Cup